FPZ can be an abbreviation for
 Forum Party of Zimbabwe
 FpZ: an EEG electrode site according to the 10-20 system